El Dorado Transit is the operator of mass transportation in El Dorado County, California. Service is provided to the highly urbanized corridor of Western Slope suburbs of Sacramento, California. Six local routes are offered, providing weekday service between shopping and business destinations within the county. The commuter routes form the core of the system, running run from Placerville to Downtown Sacramento and offer six park-and-ride options to travelers. Twice daily reverse commuter options also travel from Sacramento to El Dorado County. The 50 Express provides hourly buses travel from Missouri Flat Rd. to and from Red Hawk Casino, Cameron Park, El Dorado Hills, the Sacramento RT Iron Point light rail station, and to Folsom Lake College.

Routes
20 Placerville
25 Saturday Express
30 Diamond Springs/El Dorado
35 Diamond Springs/El Dorado (Saturday)
40 Cameron Park/Shingle Springs
50 Express (Placerville to Folsom)
60 Pollock Pines/Camino
Sacramento Commuter
Sacramento/South Lake Tahoe Connecting Bus (Amtrak Thruway route)

References

Bus transportation in California
Transportation in Sacramento, California
Transit agencies in California
1975 establishments in California